Iodine-123 (123I) is a radioactive isotope of iodine used in nuclear medicine imaging, including single-photon emission computed tomography (SPECT) or SPECT/CT exams.  The isotope's half-life is 13.2230 hours; the decay by electron capture to tellurium-123 emits gamma radiation with a predominant energy of 159 keV (this is the gamma primarily used for imaging). In medical applications, the radiation is detected by a gamma camera. The isotope is typically applied as iodide-123, the anionic form.

Production

Iodine-123 is produced in a cyclotron by proton irradiation of xenon in a capsule. Xenon-124 absorbs a proton and immediately loses a neutron and proton to form xenon-123, or else loses two neutrons to form caesium-123, which decays to xenon-123. The xenon-123 formed by either route then decays to iodine-123, and is trapped on the inner wall of the irradiation capsule under refrigeration, then eluted with sodium hydroxide in a halogen disproportionation reaction, similar to collection of iodine-125 after it is formed from xenon by neutron irradiation (see article on 125I for more details).

 (p,pn)  → 

 (p,2n)  →  → 

Iodine-123 is usually supplied as []-sodium iodide in 0.1 M sodium hydroxide solution, at 99.8% isotopic purity.

123I for medical applications has also been produced at Oak Ridge National Laboratory by proton cyclotron bombardment of 80% isotopically enriched tellurium-123.

 (p,n)

Decay

The detailed decay mechanism is electron capture (EC) to form an excited state of the nearly-stable nuclide tellurium-123 (its half life is so long that it is considered stable for all practical purposes). This excited state of 123Te produced is not the metastable nuclear isomer 123mTe (the decay of 123I does not involve enough energy to produce 123mTe), but rather is a lower-energy nuclear isomer of 123Te that immediately gamma decays to ground state 123Te at the energies noted, or else (13% of the time) decays by internal conversion electron emission (127 keV), followed by an average of 11 Auger electrons emitted at very low energies (50-500 eV). The latter decay channel also produces ground-state 123Te. Especially because of the internal conversion decay channel, 123I is not an absolutely pure gamma-emitter, although it is sometimes clinically assumed to be one.

The Auger electrons from the radioisotope have been found in one study to do little cellular damage, unless the radionuclide is directly incorporated chemically into cellular DNA, which is not the case for present radiopharmaceuticals which use 123I as the radioactive label nuclide. The damage from the more penetrating gamma radiation and 127 keV internal conversion electron radiation from the initial decay of 123Te is moderated by the relatively short half-life of the isotope.

Medical applications

123I is the most suitable isotope of iodine for the diagnostic study of thyroid diseases. The half-life of approximately 13.2 hours is ideal for the 24-hour iodine uptake test and 123I has other advantages for diagnostic imaging thyroid tissue and thyroid cancer metastasis. The energy of the photon, 159 keV, is ideal for the NaI (sodium iodide) crystal detector of current gamma cameras and also for the pinhole collimators. It has much greater photon flux than 131I. It gives approximately 20 times the counting rate of 131I for the same administered dose, while the radiation burden to the thyroid is far less (1%) than that of 131I. Moreover, scanning a thyroid remnant or metastasis with 123I does not cause "stunning" of the tissue (with loss of uptake), because of the low radiation burden of this isotope. For the same reasons, 123I is never used for thyroid cancer or Graves disease treatment, and this role is reserved for 131I.

123I is supplied as sodium iodide (NaI), sometimes in basic solution in which it has been dissolved as the free element. This is administered to a patient by ingestion under capsule form, by intravenous injection, or (less commonly due to problems involved in a spill) in a drink. The iodine is taken up by the thyroid gland and a gamma camera is used to obtain functional images of the thyroid for diagnosis. Quantitative measurements of the thyroid can be performed to calculate the iodine uptake (absorption) for the diagnosis of hyperthyroidism and hypothyroidism.

Dosing can vary;  is recommended for thyroid imaging and for total body while an uptake test may use . There is a study that indicates a given dose can effectively result in effects of an otherwise higher dose, due to impurities in the preparation. The dose of radioiodine 123I is typically tolerated by individuals who cannot tolerate contrast mediums containing larger concentration of stable iodine such as used in CT scan, intravenous pyelogram (IVP) and similar imaging diagnostic procedures. Iodine is not an allergen.

123I is also used as a label in other imaging radiopharmaceuticals e.g.metaiodobenzylguanidine (MIBG) and ioflupane.

Precautions
Removal of radioiodine contamination can be difficult and use of a decontaminant specially made for radioactive iodine removal is advised. Two common products designed for institutional use are Bind-It and I-Bind. General purpose radioactive decontamination products are often unusable for iodine, as these may only spread or volatilize it.

See also 
 Isotopes of iodine
 Iodine-125
 Iodine-129
 Iodine-131
 Iodine in biology

References

Isotopes of iodine
Medical isotopes